Tashi delek is a Tibetan expression used in greeting, congratulation, and good-luck wishes. It is also used in Bhutan and in North East India in the same way. "Tashi delek" is associated with Losar, the festival of the lunisolar new year.

Origin and meaning
Tashi means "auspicious" and delek (or Deleg, Deleh) means "fine" or "well". It is difficult and perhaps impossible to translate properly into English. Different authors render it as "Blessings and good luck" or "May all auspicious signs come to this environment".

Usage
"Tashi delek" is traditionally used as part of a larger invocation on Losar. With the Dalai Lama's exile and creation of the Tibetan diaspora, exile authorities promoted the use of "tashi delek" as an all-purpose greeting which could be easily picked up by foreign sponsors. Students of the exile school system are taught that this usage of "tashi delek" has roots in premodern Tibet, and that Chinese Tibetans' exclusive usage of "tashi delek" for New Year's is corrupt. Tour operators have promoted the phrase, along with khata scarves and prayer flags, as essentialized and commodifiable aspects of Tibetan culture, a fact that has caused resentment among some religious Tibetans. "Tashi Delek" is the name of a website that provides information on the nation of Bhutan and promotes Tourism.

The phrase "Tashi delek" is also used in Chinese with the Chinese transcription Zhaxi Dele. There is a song called Zhaxi Dele with lyrics by Rongzhong Erjia (容中尔甲), a Tibetan, and music by Chang Yingzhong (昌英中), a Han Chinese.

The phrase is also used in Bhutan, Sikkim, and Nepal. There is a company in Bhutan called TashiDelek.com and a Hotel Tashi Delek in Gangtok, Sikkim. The inflight magazine of the Bhutanese airline Druk Air is called Tashi Delek.

References

Notes

Sources

External links
 Bhutanese Tashi Delek Net

Tibetan culture
Tibetan words and phrases
Greeting words and phrases